Gasparo Berti ( 1600–1643) was an Italian mathematician, astronomer and physicist. He was probably born in Mantua and spent most of his life in Rome. He is most famous today for his experiment in which he unknowingly created the first working barometer. Though he was best known for his work in mathematics and physics, little of his work in either survives.

In 1630, Giovanni Battista Baliani sent a letter to Galileo Galilei after he noticed that  his siphon could not raise water more than about 10 m (34 feet). Galileo proposed that a vacuum held the water up and that it could not hold any more. At the time the existence of vacuums was controversial.

Upon reading Galileo's theory in his Discorsi, Berti and another man named Raffaele Magiotti  devised an experiment to test the existence of a vacuum. Some time between 1640 and 1643, Berti built an 11 m  lead tube, filled it with water, and sealed both ends. He submerged one end in water and unsealed it. Though some of the water flowed out, much of it remained, filling about 10 m (34 feet) of the tube, the same height of Baliani's syphon. Berti claimed that the space above was filled with a vacuum. His claim was strongly contested, and multiple experiments were performed attempting to disprove the existence of a vacuum. This experiment led to Evangelista Torricelli's research into the weight of air and his invention of the barometer.

Berti held a chair of mathematics at the University of Rome La Sapienza. He was to succeed Benedetto Castelli as professor of mathematics there, but he died before he could begin teaching. He also mapped the Roman catacombs.

References

Further reading

1600s births
1643 deaths
17th-century Italian mathematicians
17th-century Italian astronomers
17th-century Italian physicists
Scientists from Mantua
Year of birth uncertain